Tugboat M 17 (German: Schleppzug M 17) is a 1933 German drama film directed by Heinrich George and Werner Hochbaum and starring Heinrich George, Berta Drews and Betty Amann. George, a prominent actor, directed much of the film before it was finished by Hochbaum. Location filming took place on the Ruppiner See. It portrays life on a German boat on Germany's inland waterways in the vicinity of Berlin.

It premiered at the Ufa-Palast am Zoo on 19 April 1933.

Cast
 Heinrich George as Henner, der Schiffer
 Berta Drews as Marie, seine Frau
 Joachim Streubel as Franz, sein Kind
 Betty Amann as Gescha 
 Wilfried Seyferth as Jakob
 Maria Schanda as Eine Sängerin
 Robert Müller as Jakobs Vater
 Kurt Getke as Piet 
 Friedrich Ettel as Orje
 Hansjoachim Büttner as Karl
 Walter Steiner as Ein Kommerzienrat
 Alexander Jonas as Ein Wirt

References

Bibliography 
 Bock, Hans-Michael & Bergfelder, Tim. The Concise Cinegraph: Encyclopaedia of German Cinema. Berghahn Books, 2009.

External links 
 
 Schleppzug M 17 Full movie at the Deutsche Filmothek

1933 films
1933 drama films
Films of Nazi Germany
German drama films
1930s German-language films
Films directed by Werner Hochbaum
Films set in Berlin
Seafaring films
German black-and-white films
1930s German films